National Initiative for Cybersecurity Careers and Studies (NICCS) is an online training initiative and portal built as per the National Initiative for Cybersecurity Education framework. This is a federal cybersecurity training subcomponent, operated and maintained by Cybersecurity and Infrastructure Security Agency.

History 
The initiative was launched by Janet Napolitano, then-Secretary of Homeland Security of Department of Homeland Security on February 21, 2013. The primary objective of the initiative is to develop and train the next generation of American cyber professional by involving academia and the private sector.

Federal Virtual Training Environment 
NICCS hosts Federal Virtual Training Environment, a completely free online cybersecurity training system for federal and state government employees. It contains more than 800 hours of training materials on ethical hacking and surveillance, risk management, and malware analysis.

See also 
 Cybersecurity and Infrastructure Security Agency
National Cyber Security Division
National Initiative for Cybersecurity Education

References 

Initiatives_in_the_United_States
Computer network security